The plebiscite about the division of the state of Pará occurred in the referred state on 11 December 2011, being considered the largest regional plebiscite in the Brazilian history, having as proposal the division of the state in three: Pará, Carajás and Tapajós.

Plebiscite development
When it was approved, a doubt has risen about if it would be held only in the regions of Carajás and Tapajós, or in the entire state of Pará. It had occurred due to the question of the constitutionality of Law no. 9709/1998. The law predicts the participation of the statewide population in plebiscites to decide divisions of territories for the creation of other states. On 24 August, it was decided that the whole state of Pará would be consulted. It means that there should be support from the majority of the population of the state for the creation of the new states.

In the calendar defined by the Superior Electoral Court, the 2 September was the limit date for members of the Legislative Assembly of Pará, the Chamber of Deputies and the Federal Senate to manifest themselves to compose one of the fronts of the plebiscite (for or against the creation of the two states). The registration of the two fronts should be protocoled in the Regional Electoral Court of Pará until 12 September.

The campaign for the creation of the two new states through the internet, flyers and sound cars began on 13 September. The first opinion polls also could be registered in the Electoral Court of Pará from this date.

The free campaign on radio and TV began on 11 November. The period of campaign would finish three days before the plebiscite. On 23 November, the electronic polls were sealed and on 10 December the campaign through speakers and sound amplifiers was finished. The distribution of printed materials was also prohibited from this date. The definitive result of the plebiscite was published only two hours after the end of the voting.

The voters who had the intention to participate in the plebiscite should regulate their situation in the Electoral Justice of Pará until 11 September. In the polls, the residents of Pará answered to two questions: "Are you in favor of the division of the State of Pará for the creation of the State of Carajás?" and "Are you in favor of the division of the State of Pará for the creation of the State of Tapajós?"

For the creation of the new states, Tapajós would occupy 58% of the current territory of Pará and would have 27 municipalities. Carajás would have 25% of the territory with 39 municipalities. The remaining Pará would keep 17% of the territory.

According to the Superior Electoral Court, the cost of the plebiscite surpassed R$ 19 million (US$  in 2011).

Opinion polls

Results

References

Referendums in Brazil
2011 referendums
2011 in Brazil
Proposed states and territories of Brazil
October 2011 events in South America